HMS Dulverton was a Type II  of the Royal Navy.  Launched in 1941, she saw service during the Second World War until being damaged by German aircraft in 1943 during the Battle of Leros, and was scuttled.  The Commander during her last battle was Stuart Austen Buss, MVO, DSC, RN.  He did not survive.

Dulverton was ordered from Alexander Stephen and Sons of Govan on the outbreak of war in 1939.  She was laid down on 16 July 1940, and launched 1 April 1941. She was completed by September 1941.

Service history
Dulverton participated in many operations, including escorting troop convoys bound for Suez Canal and the convoys to Malta including the first one to lift the siege there, supporting the British Eighth Army in North Africa, the Tobruk Raid, and the destruction of the German submarine  with other destroyers and the Royal Air Force.

In October 1943 Dulverton was involved in the Dodecanese Campaign, as part of a force that was trying to capture the Greek islands of Kos and Leros on 20 October and again on 4 November. On 12 November, Dulverton returned to support the garrison on Leros which had just been invaded by the Germans. On 13 November, whilst five miles off the coast of Kos, she was attacked by German Do 217 E-5 aircraft from KG 100 using Hs 293 glider bombs, one of which struck Dulverton abreast of the bridge.

References

Publications
 
 English, John (1987). The Hunts: a history of the design, development and careers of the 86 destroyers of this class built for the Royal and Allied Navies during World War II. England: World Ship Society. .

External links 
 

 

Hunt-class destroyers of the Royal Navy
Ships built in Govan
1941 ships
World War II destroyers of the United Kingdom
World War II shipwrecks in the Mediterranean Sea
Maritime incidents in November 1943
Destroyers sunk by aircraft
Ships sunk by German aircraft